Reinhold Pauli (25 May 1823 in Berlin – 3 June 1882 in Bremen) was a German historian of England.

Life
He studied at the universities of Bonn and Berlin, where he received his PhD in 1846. In 1847 he moved to England, where he served as private secretary to Baron von Bunsen, the Prussian ambassador in London. In 1852–55 he studied history in Edinburgh, Oxford, Cambridge and London. In 1855 he returned to Germany, and successively became a professor of history at the universities of Rostock, Tübingen, Marburg and Göttingen. In 1866 he left the University of Tübingen because of his political views.

He wrote The Life of King Alfred (1852), History of England from the Accession of Henry II to the Death of Henry VII, Pictures of Old England (1861) and Simon de Montfort (1876).

Influence
John Robert Seeley dedicated his biography of Heinrich Friedrich Karl vom und zum Stein to Pauli, stating that "Germany may boast of having put the history of every great European state as much within the reach of her public as her own history. Your countrymen can study the affairs of foreign countries not merely in translations, or hasty magazine-articles, but in elaborate works, written in their own language, with full responsibility and independence of judgment, written also by those who understand clearly the wants the public which they write. Among this group of writers you are best known in England, and I shall make my object in writing this best understood by announcing in this dedication that I belong to your school"

References

Attribution

External links

 "Reinhold Pauli" German wikipedia
 
 
 

19th-century German historians
Members of the Prussian House of Lords
1823 births
1882 deaths
Academic staff of the University of Marburg
Academic staff of the University of Tübingen
Academic staff of the University of Göttingen
Academic staff of the University of Rostock
19th-century German male writers
German male non-fiction writers